Einosuke (written: 栄之助, 永之助 or 永之介) is a masculine Japanese given name. Notable people with the name include:

, Japanese Buddhist leader
, Japanese ophthalmologist
, Japanese writer
, Japanese samurai

Japanese masculine given names